Bobi Wine: Ghetto President is a 2022 Ugandan-British-American documentary film written and directed by Christopher Sharp and Moses Bwayo. It chronicles the presidential campaign of popular Ugandian singer Bobi Wine against long-ruling regime leader Yoweri Museveni. It premiered out of competition at the 79th edition of the Venice Film Festival.

Reception
On Rotten Tomatoes, the film has a 100% approval rating based on 5 reviews.

References

External links
 
 
2022 documentary films
British documentary films   
American documentary films 
Ugandan documentary films